The flag of Kursk Oblast was adopted on 17 December 1996. The flag consists of five stripes of red, silver, gold, and black in the ratio 2:1:1:1:2. The black, white, and gold stripes are defaced by the coat of arms of Kursk Oblast. The flag has a width-length ratio of 2:3 and was adopted under law N19-3KO.

References 

Flags of the federal subjects of Russia
Flag
Flags displaying animals